Serhiy Shevchuk may refer to:
Serhiy Shevchuk (footballer, born 1985), Ukrainian footballer
Serhiy Shevchuk (footballer, born 1990), Ukrainian footballer